El Cuá is a municipality in the Jinotega department of Nicaragua.  Formerly part of the municipality of El Cuá-Bocay, it became a separate municipality in 2002. Its population rose from 43305 in 2005 to 56897 in 2012.

The area around El Cuá saw bitter fighting during the Contra War in the 1980s, and the village was the home of that war's only known United States casualty, the engineer Ben Linder. The hydroelectric plant on which Linder worked continues to be the source of electric power in El Cuá and neighboring San José de Bocay.

Geography
El Cuá borders the municipalities of Wiwilí de Nueva Segovia and San José de Bocay to the north, El Tuma-La Dalia and Rancho Grande to the south, Waslala and Siuna to the east, and Santa María de Pantasma and Jinotega to the west.

El Cuá contains mountainous areas with abundant vegetation. Altitude is highly variable, ranging from 300 meters above sea level at the Coco River up to 1,745 meters above sea level in the Peñas Blancas massif and Kilambé hill. Numerous rivers continue flowing throughout the year, with high potential for the generation of hydroelectric power, and abundant fish and crustacean populations are a part of the local population's diet. Rivers of particularly notable size and length include the Cua, Gusanera, Bocay, and Lakus rivers and the Coco or Segovia river in its upper basin, which marks the border between Nicaragua and Honduras.

History
The indigenous population of the area were the Caribiés, later known as the Chontales. Until 1897, El Cuá was the administrative seat of the Bocay District.

When the Bocay district was annexed to the department of Jinotega, the municipal territory was unpopulated although the area contained substantial natural resources. The territory of Cua-Bocay was an integral part of the municipality of Jinotega until 1989 when the municipality of Cua Bocay was created, in accordance with the Law of Administrative Political Division issued by the National Assembly.

Climate
The area has a tropical climate, with temperatures ranging between 24º and 25 °C and abundant rainfall between 1,600 and 2,000 mm per year. The wet season lasts approximately eight months and the remainder of the year is the dry season.

Localities
The municipality is divided into three different areas based on physical characteristics:
     South Zone: El Cuá, made up of 11 comarcas and 74 communities.
     Central Zone: San José de Bocay, made up of 12 comarcas and 63 communities.
     North Zone: Ayapal, made up of 13 comarcas and 50 communities.

Economy
Agriculture is the principal economic sector. There are approximately 4,000 landowners, mainly small producers with farms smaller than 20 Manzanas (a Manzana in Nicaragua is equivalent to 1.74 acres). Agriculture is the primary means by which families are supported.

References

Municipalities of the Jinotega Department